The Great Mint Swindle is a 2012 Australian television film directed by Geoff Bennett and starring Grant Bowler, Todd Lasance and Josh Quong Tart. It is based on the Perth Mint Swindle which took place in the 1980s.

Plot summary
In the beginning of the 1980s boom in Western Australia, the Mickelberg brothers Ray (Grant Bowler), Peter (Todd Lasance) and Brian (Josh Quong Tart) spend their days looking for adventure and finding new ways to earn money. One day, they are accused of stealing 49 gold bars from a mint in Perth and selling them to tycoon Alan Bond (David Meadows). For 20 years, the fight to clear the Mickelberg brothers of a crime that they didn't commit goes on which to this day remains unsolved.

Cast
 Grant Bowler as Ray Mickelberg
 Todd Lasance as Peter Mickelberg
 Josh Quong Tart as Brian Mickelberg
 Shane Bourne as Don Hancock
 John Batchelor as Tony Lewandowski
 Maya Stange as Sheryl Mickelberg
 Caroline McKenzie as Peg Mickelberg
 Abby Earl as Diana
 Talei Howell-Price as Fay Mickelberg

Reception
The TV movie was viewed by 1.073 million viewers and ranked at 8th place.

See also
The Great Gold Swindle, a 1984 telemovie that's also about the mint swindle

References

External links
The Great Mint Swindle at the Internet Movie Database

Films set in Western Australia
Perth Mint Swindle
Australian drama television films
Australian crime drama films
2012 television films
2012 films